Grant McKelvey (born 28 December 1968) is a senior manager at the Scottish Rugby Union who has also worked as a rugby union coach. He was previously a Scotland international rugby union player.

Early life
McKelvey was born on 28 December 1968 in Chingola, Zambia. He went to Knox Academy in Haddington.

Rugby Union career

Amateur career

He started off playing for Haddington and then played for Watsonians.

Professional and provincial career

He was named as a replacement in the Cities District side to play Australia in October 1996. However he did not play.

McKelvey played for Edinburgh Rugby.

International career

He played for the Scottish Schools under-15s in 1984.

He played one Autumn international match as hooker for Scotland against Australia at Murrayfield on 22 November 1997.

Coaching career

In July 2000 the Reivers announced that he had left their squad to concentrate on his work as a SRU development officer in East Lothian.

He coached Musselburgh RFC until 2003 when he became the rugby development manager for Edinburgh.

In 2007 he became the Scotland national under-18 rugby union team coach, having previously coached the under-17 team. In December 2014 he became a talent identification and performance projects manager.

References

Living people
Rugby union hookers
1968 births
Scotland international rugby union players
Edinburgh Rugby players
People educated at Knox Academy
Haddington RFC players
Watsonians RFC players